Albert Livingston Hadley Jr. (November 18, 1920 – March 29, 2012) was an American interior designer and decorator.

Hadley was born in Springfield, Tennessee, in 1920. He attended Peabody College in Nashville for two years, after which he worked as an assistant to one of the South's best-known decorators, A. Herbert Rodgers.

After serving overseas in World War II, Hadley moved to New York. Beginning in 1947, he studied at the Parsons School of Design, and after graduating in 1949, joined the school's faculty. He formed his own design studio, worked from 1956 until 1962 at the distinguished New York interior design firm of McMillen, Inc., and then co-founded Parish-Hadley, Associates (1962–1999) with the interior decorator, Sister Parish (1910–1994). 

Hadley's clients included former Vice President Albert Gore and Tipper Gore; Babe Paley and William S. Paley; Oscar de la Renta and Annette de la Renta; Jacqueline Kennedy Onassis; 
Ambassador and Mrs. Henry Grunwald; Dr. and Mrs. G. Patrick Maxwell; Mike Nichols and Diane Sawyer; Mrs. Brooke Astor; and various members of the Astor and Getty families.

Hadley worked in a variety of styles, including modern, Victorian, and Georgian. He was lauded with numerous international design awards for his creative output. He was inducted into the Interior Design Hall of Fame in 1986.

References

Further reading

1920 births
2012 deaths
American interior designers
People from Springfield, Tennessee
Artists from New York City
American designers
American military personnel of World War II